Pok Hong is one of the 41 constituencies in the Sha Tin District in Hong Kong.

The constituency returns one district councillor to the Sha Tin District Council, with an election every four years.

The Pok Hong constituency is loosely based on Pok Hong Estate, with an estimated population of 16,063.

Councillors represented

Election results

2010s

2000s

1990s

References

Sha Tin Wai
Constituencies of Hong Kong
Constituencies of Sha Tin District Council
1994 establishments in Hong Kong
Constituencies established in 1994